USS Protector (AGR/YAGR-11) was a  of the United States Navy. A Liberty Ship acquired in 1957, she was reconfigured as a radar picket ship and assigned to radar picket duty in the North Atlantic Ocean as part of the Distant Early Warning Line.

Construction
The third ship to be so named by the Navy, Protector (YAGR–11) was laid down on 31 January 1945, under a Maritime Commission (MARCOM) contract, MC hull 2346, as the Liberty Ship Warren P. Marks, by J.A. Jones Construction, Panama City, Florida. She was launched 15 March 1945; sponsored by Mrs. E. M. Hinson; and delivered 29 March 1945, to the Shepard Steamship Company.

Service history 
Operated by the Shepard Steamship Co., from 1945 to 1957, Warren P. Marks was converted Charleston Navy Yard, Charleston, South Carolina, and commissioned Protector (YAGR–11), 20 February 1957.

After shakedown off Guantanamo Bay, Cuba, Protector, homeported at Davisville, Rhode Island, reported to Commandant, 1st Naval District for administrative control and to Commander YAGR Division 21 for duty and was assigned as an Ocean Station Radar Picket Ship in the seaward extension of the Eastern Continental Air Defense Command (CONAD)'s Contiguous Radar Coverage System.
 
Continuing her duties off the US East Coast, Protector was redesignated AGR-11 on 28 October 1958. She continued her radar picket duty until 1965. During the Cuban invasion in the spring of 1962, and the Cuban Missile Crisis in the fall, Protector operated in the Florida Straits and established a new radar picket station.
 
On 10 February 1965, Protector terminated picket duty as the last picket ship to man Radar Picket Station No. 15 of NORAD Contiguous Radar Coverage System.

Decommissioning
On 28 July 1965, she decommissioned at Bayonne, New Jersey, and was placed in the US Maritime Administration (MARAD) National Defense Reserve Fleet, Hudson River Reserve Fleet, Jones Point, New York, as an Emergency Relocation Center Ship, where she remained until she was towed to the Norfolk Naval Shipyard where her engine was removed. She was then placed for sale as scrap, with scrapping completed 30 November 2005.

Military awards and honors
Protectors crew was eligible for the following medals:
 Navy Expeditionary Medal (2-Cuba) 
 National Defense Service Medal

See also 
 United States Navy
 Radar picket

References

Bibliography

External links 
 

 

Liberty ships
Ships built in Panama City, Florida
1945 ships
World War II merchant ships of the United States
Guardian-class radar picket ships
Cold War auxiliary ships of the United States
Hudson River Reserve Fleet